Tell Barri (ancient Kahat) is a tell, or archaeological settlement mound, in north-eastern Syria in the Al-Hasakah Governorate. Its ancient name was Kahat as proven by a threshold found on the south-western slope of the mound.  Tell Barri is situated along the Wadi Jaghjagh, a tributary of the Khabur River.

It lies 22 kilometers away from the site Tell Arbid and 8 kilometers north of the ancient city of Nagar (Tell Brak).

History
The earliest layers discovered at Tell Barri date to the Halaf period. Barri was in the fertile crescent and could benefit from winter rains as well as the river water. This developed the early agriculture of the area.

Early Bronze
The site of Tell Barri was inhabited since the fourth millennium BC. Significant discoveries include a sacred complex in Area G.

Akkadian Period
Barri came under Akkadian cultural influence. The large urban centre at Tell Brak was nearby.

Middle Bronze
In the Middle Bronze IIA, the eighteenth century BC, the city now known as Kahat is attested from the palace archives of Mari. Kahat seems to have been ruled by semi-independent kings. The town then came under the rule of the Kingdom of Upper Mesopotamia, whose capital, Shubat-Enlil, was northeast of Kahat. When the empire collapsed, the harem of its king Shamshi-Adad I (r. 1809-1775 BC) sought refuge at Kahat.

Following the death of Shamshi-Adad I, Zimri-Lim of Mari (r. 1775-1761 BC) regain the throne of Mari and eventually conquered Kabiya of Kahat. Mari retained control over this region until its fall to Hammurabi of Babylon (r. 1792-1750 BC).

Late Bronze

Mitannian Period
By the 15th century BC, the town emerged as a religious centre when the Hurrian kingdom of Mitanni established itself in the region.

The temple to the Storm god Teshub in Kahat is specifically mentioned in the Shattiwaza treaty of the fourteenth century BC. In 1345 BC, Suppiluliuma I of Hatti defeated the Mitanni stronghold of Carchemish, which led to the defeat of Tushratta of Mitanni. Tushratta was assassinated and the Mitanni Empire entered a civil war. Suppiluliuma entered a treaty with Shattiwaza (r. 1330-1305 BC), son of Tushratta, making the remanants of the Kingdom of Mitanni a vassal of the Hittites, and a buffer-state between Hatti in the west and Assyria in the east.

Assyrian Period
Shortly afterwards the town fell into the hands of the Middle Assyrian Empire.  A large palace was built dated to the time of Assyrian ruler Adad-Nirari I (c. 1305 to 1274 BC).

Iron Age
In the Neo-Assyrian Empire period a palace was built by the Assyrian king Tukulti-Ninurta II (891-884 BC) in Kahat.

The town lived on after the end of the Assyrian empire in the seventh century BC as a part of Achaemenid Assyria. Babylonians, Persians, Seleucids, Romans, Byzantine, and Parthians left their trace. The site was inhabited into the Arab period.

Archaeology

The height of the town mound is 32 meters (105 feet), and its base covers 37 hectares (90 acres). There is also a 7 hectare lower town.

In 1980 excavations were begun by a team of Italian archaeologists from the University of Florence, led by Paolo Emilio Pecorella and Mirjo Salvini. From 2006 until 2010, the dig was conducted by a team from University of Naples Federico II led by Raffaella Pierobon-Benoit.

The town was walled in the second millennium BC, with an acropolis at its centre. Tombs were found at the site. Many ceramics were discovered, which have helped the archaeologists to determine the different strata of occupation of the mound. Artifacts from Tell Barri, including cuneiform tablets, have been taken to the museum of Aleppo.

Significant discoveries include a sacred complex in Area G (third millennium BC), the remains of the royal palace of Tukulti-Ninurta II (Neo-Assyrian period), and the Great Circuit Wall that surrounds the tell and dates to the Parthian period. Scant traces of Roman occupation have been found in many areas of the site. Recently, Islamic occupation (houses' quarter) has been attested on the northern slope of the mound.

The site has suffered significant looting during the Syrian Civil War.

See also

 Cities of the ancient Near East
 Short chronology timeline

Notes

References

Benoit, Raffaella Pierobon, "Tell Barri/Kahat 2000-2010: The Contribution of the Excavations to the History of the Jezireh.", Archaeological Explorations in Syria 2000-2011: Proceedings of ISCACH-Beirut 2015, 2018
 Pecorella, Paolo Emilio, and Mirjo Salvani, "Tell Barri-Kaḫat", Syria, vol. 62, no. 1/2, 1985, pp. 128–30, 1985
 Paolo Emilio Pecorella, Tell Barri/Kahat: la campagna del 2000: relazione preliminare, Firenze University Press, 2003, 
 Paolo Emilio Pecorella and Raffaella Pierobon Benoit, Tell Barri/Kahat: la campagna del 2001: relazione preliminare, Firenze University Press, 2004, 
 Paolo Emilio Pecorella and Raffaella Pierobon Benoit, Tell Barri/Kahat: la campagna del 2002: relazione preliminare, Firenze, 2005, 
 Paolo Emilio Pecorella and Raffaella Pierobon Benoit, Tell Barri/Kahat: la campagna del 2003: relazione preliminare, Firenze University Press, 2008, 
 Paolo Emilio Pecorella and Raffaella Pierobon Benoit, Tell Barri - Kahat: la campagna del 2004, Firenze University Press, 2008, 
 A. Sołtysiak, "Short Fieldwork Report: Tell Barri (Syria), seasons 1980–2006", Bioarchaeology of the Near East, vol.  2, pp 67–71, 2008
 Sołtysiak, A., and R. Koliński, "Tell Barri (Syria), seasons 2008–2010 Arkadiusz Sołtysiak.", Bioarchaeology of the Near East 4, pp. 48-50, 2010
 Sołtysiak, Arkadiusz, and Holger Schutkowski, "Continuity and change in subsistence at Tell Barri, NE Syria.", Journal of Archaeological Science: Reports 2, pp. 176-185, 2015

External links
 Tell Barri dig web site (italian)
 Shelby White - Leon Levy grant to publish Late Bronze age data

Neolithic sites in Syria
Hurrian cities
Former populated places in Syria
Archaeological sites in al-Hasakah Governorate
Bronze Age sites in Syria
Barri
Ancient Assyrian cities